Birkenhead Lake Provincial Park is a provincial park in British Columbia, Canada, located in the Lillooet Country region to the northeast of Pemberton and immediately northwest of Birkenhead Peak and Gates Lake (a.k.a. Birken Lake) at the community of Birken.

History and conservation
It was established in 1963 to provide a recreation and conservation area between the Pemberton Valley and Lillooet and it has 79 vehicle accessible campsites and a lakeside beach area. The park's wildlife includes mountain goats, black bears and grizzly bears while the lake itself is home to Rainbow Trout and Kokanee.  The lake is also home to a protected species of Bull Trout, often mistaken for Dolly Varden.

Location and access
It is located 90 kilometres north-east of Whistler, the last 12 kilometres of which are a non-paved gravel road branching off the main paved from between Mount Currie and D'Arcy via Blackwater Creek, a tributary of the Gates River, a few miles northeast of the community of Birken.

Size
Birkenhead Lake Provincial Park is 97.55 km2.

External links
Birkenhead Lake Provincial Park.

Provincial parks of British Columbia
Sea-to-Sky Corridor
Lillooet Country
1963 establishments in British Columbia
Protected areas of British Columbia